Chewning House, also known as the McCurry Hotel, Charleston Boarding House, and Claddagh Inn, is a historic hotel building located at Hendersonville, Henderson County, North Carolina. The house was built before 1906, and enlarged between 1912 and 1922 from a two-story building to the present three-story building with Classical Revival style design elements.  It features a one-story hip roofed wraparound porch.

It was listed on the National Register of Historic Places in 1989.

References

External links
Claddagh Inn website

Hotel buildings on the National Register of Historic Places in North Carolina
Neoclassical architecture in North Carolina
Hotel buildings completed in 1906
Buildings and structures in Henderson County, North Carolina
National Register of Historic Places in Henderson County, North Carolina
Hendersonville, North Carolina
1906 establishments in North Carolina